"Need a Boss" is the debut single from singer Shareefa from her debut album Point of No Return. The single features label mate and DTP's founder Ludacris and was produced by Rodney "Darkchild" Jerkins. It samples The Stylistics "Let's Put It All Together". "Need a Boss" peaked on the Billboard Hot 100 at number 62, on the Hot R&B/Hip-Hop Singles & Tracks at number 10, and BET's 106 & Park at number 4. It had success on BET and receiving heavy airplay on the 106 & Park countdown for a long span of time and peaking in the top 5 at number 4. A cover remix was made by Ace Valentine entitled "Need A Ghetto Girl".

Charts

Weekly charts

Year-end charts

References

2006 songs
2006 debut singles
Ludacris songs
Music videos directed by Melina Matsoukas
Shareefa songs
Song recordings produced by Rodney Jerkins
Songs written by Hugo Peretti
Songs written by Luigi Creatore
Songs written by George David Weiss
Songs written by Rodney Jerkins
Songs written by Ludacris